Belfort is an unincorporated community in Stark County, in the U.S. state of Ohio.

History
Belfort was laid out in 1849, and named after Belfort, in France, the ancestral home of a share of the first settlers.

References

Unincorporated communities in Stark County, Ohio
Unincorporated communities in Ohio